The Indian Tomb is a 1938 German adventure film directed by Richard Eichberg and starring Philip Dorn, La Jana and Theo Lingen. It is the sequel to Eichberg's The Tiger of Eschnapur.

Plot 
The sequel to the film The Tiger of Eschnapur shows the hunt for Sitha and Sascha around the world disguised as the Maharaja's journey with Irene Traven and Prince Ramigani, while Fürbringer, Emil Sperling and his wife Lotte Sperling work on the Maharaja's construction projects in India. In Bombay, Ramigani manages to track down Sitha in a second-rate variety show. Before that, however, Sitha can contact Irene Traven. Before the two can speak to each other, Sitha is kidnapped by Prince Ramigani. While the Maharaja travels to Eschnapur with his entourage and shows Irene his country, Ramigani and other nobles of the country forge a revolt with the aim of Ramigani himself becoming the Maharaja. Sitha is taken to a remote mountain castle, but Sitha's servant Myrrha manages to smuggle Irene into the heavily guarded mountain castle for a talk with Sitha. When Irene asks the Maharaja for mercy for Sitha, the latter refuses. While planning to kill Chandra during a festival, Ramigani has Irene Traven and Fürbringer captured. Disguised as an Indian, Emil Sperling escapes capture and frees Fürbringer and Irene with the help of Sascha Demidoff. For the festival, Ramigani forces Sitha to dance. When she approaches the Maharaja in her dance and warns of the attack by Ramigani, she is shot. The revolt that breaks out is also suppressed and Ramigani dies fleeing his just punishment. The Maharaja now asks advocates to stay to complete the tomb of Sitha.

Cast 
Philip Dorn as Maharadscha von Eschnapur
Kitty Jantzen as Irene Traven
La Jana as Indira, eine indische Tänzerin
Theo Lingen as Emil Sperling
Hans Stüwe as Peter Fürbringer, Architekt
Alexander Golling as Prinz Ramigani, Vetter des Maharadscha
Gustav Diessl as Sascha Demidoff, Ingenieur
Gisela Schlüter as Lotte Sperling
Karl Haubenreißer as Gopal, Würdenträger in Eschnapur
Olaf Bach as Sadhu, Radscha eines Bergvolkes
Rosa Jung as Myrrha, Vertraute der Maharani
Albert Hörrmann as Ragupati, im Dienste Ramiganis
Gerhard Bienert as Ratani, Werkmeister
Valy Arnheim as Wachmann Ramura
Carl Auen as Indischer Nobiler
Rudolf Essek as Hotelgast in Bombay
Jutta Jol as Indische dienerin bei irene traven
Fred Goebel as Indischer Ingenieur
Klaus Pohl as Inder, der beim Fest nach den Gewehren fragt
Paul Rehkopf as Indischer Nobiler
Gerhard Dammann
Josef Peterhans as Indischer Nobiler

References

Bibliography
 Goble, Alan. The Complete Index to Literary Sources in Film. Walter de Gruyter, 1999.

External links 

1938 films
1938 adventure films
German adventure films
Films of Nazi Germany
1930s German-language films
Films directed by Richard Eichberg
German black-and-white films
Films based on German novels
Films based on works by Thea von Harbou
Films set in India
Remakes of German films
Sound film remakes of silent films
German multilingual films
1938 multilingual films
1930s German films